Extreme weather or extreme climate events includes unexpected, unusual, severe, or unseasonal weather; weather at the extremes of the historical distribution—the range that has been seen in the past. Often, extreme events are based on a location's recorded weather history and defined as lying in the most unusual ten percent. The main types of extreme weather include heat waves, cold waves and tropical cyclones. The effects of extreme weather events are seen in rising economic costs, loss of human lives, droughts, floods, landslides and changes in ecosystems.

There is evidence to suggest that climate change is increasing the periodicity and intensity of some extreme weather events. Confidence in the attribution of extreme weather and other events to anthropogenic climate change is highest in changes in frequency or magnitude of extreme heat and cold events with some confidence in increases in heavy precipitation and increases in the intensity of droughts. Current evidence and climate models show that an increasing global temperature will intensify extreme weather events around the globe, thereby amplifying human loss, damages and economic costs, and ecosystem destruction.

Extreme weather has significant impacts on human society as well as natural ecosystems. For example, a global insurer Munich Re estimates that natural disasters cause more than $90 billion global direct losses in 2015. Some human activities can exacerbate the effects, for example poor urban planning, wetland destruction, and building homes along floodplains.

Types 
Definitions of extreme weather vary in different parts of the scientific community, changing the outcomes of research from those fields.

Heat waves

Heat waves are periods of abnormally high temperatures and heat index. Definitions of a heatwave vary because of the variation of temperatures in different geographic locations. Excessive heat is often accompanied by high levels of humidity, but can also be catastrophically dry.

Because heat waves are not visible as other forms of severe weather are, like hurricanes, tornadoes, and thunderstorms, they are one of the less known forms of extreme weather. Severely hot weather can damage populations and crops due to potential dehydration or hyperthermia, heat cramps, heat expansion, and heat stroke. Dried soils are more susceptible to erosion, decreasing lands available for agriculture. Outbreaks of wildfires can increase in frequency as dry vegetation has increased likelihood of igniting. The evaporation of bodies of water can be devastating to marine populations, decreasing the size of the habitats available as well as the amount of nutrition present within the waters. Livestock and other animal populations may decline as well.

During excessive heat, plants shut their leaf pores (stomata), a protective mechanism to conserve water but also curtails plants' absorption capabilities. This leaves more pollution and ozone in the air, which leads to higher mortality in the population. It has been estimated that extra pollution during the hot summer of 2006 in the UK, cost 460 lives. The European heat waves from summer 2003 are estimated to have caused 30,000 excess deaths, due to heat stress and air pollution. Over 200 U.S cities have registered new record high temperatures. The worst heat wave in the USA occurred in 1936 and killed more than 5000 people directly. The worst heat wave in Australia occurred in 1938–39 and killed 438. The second worst was in 1896.

Power outages can also occur within areas experiencing heat waves due to the increased demand for electricity (i.e. air conditioning use). The urban heat island effect can increase temperatures, particularly overnight.

Cold waves

A cold wave is a weather phenomenon that is distinguished by a cooling of the air. Specifically, as used by the U.S. National Weather Service, a cold wave is a rapid fall in temperature within a 24-hour period requiring substantially increased protection to agriculture, industry, commerce, and social activities. The precise criterion for a cold wave is determined by the rate at which the temperature falls, and the minimum to which it falls. This minimum temperature is dependent on the geographical region and time of year. Cold waves generally are capable of occurring at any geological location and are formed by large cool air masses that accumulate over certain regions, caused by movements of air streams.

A cold wave can cause death and injury to livestock and wildlife. Exposure to cold mandates greater caloric intake for all animals, including humans, and if a cold wave is accompanied by heavy and persistent snow, grazing animals may be unable to reach necessary food and water, and die of hypothermia or starvation. Cold waves often necessitate the purchase of fodder for livestock at considerable cost to farmers. Human populations can be inflicted with frostbite when exposed for extended periods of time to cold and may result in the loss of limbs or damage to internal organs.

Extreme winter cold often causes poorly insulated water pipes to freeze. Even some poorly protected indoor plumbing may rupture as frozen water expands within them, causing property damage. Fires, paradoxically, become more hazardous during extreme cold. Water mains may break and water supplies may become unreliable, making firefighting more difficult.

Cold waves that bring unexpected freezes and frosts during the growing season in mid-latitude zones can kill plants during the early and most vulnerable stages of growth. This results in crop failure as plants are killed before they can be harvested economically. Such cold waves have caused famines. Cold waves can also cause soil particles to harden and freeze, making it harder for plants and vegetation to grow within these areas. One extreme was the so-called Year Without a Summer of 1816, one of several years during the 1810s in which numerous crops failed during freakish summer cold snaps after volcanic eruptions reduced incoming sunlight.

In some cases more frequent extremely cold winter weather – i.e. across parts of Asia and North America  including the February 2021 North American cold wave – can be a result of climate change such as due to changes in the Arctic. However, conclusions that link climate change to cold waves are considered to still be controversial. The JRC PESETA IV project concluded in 2020 that overall climate change will result in a decline in the intensity and frequency of extreme cold spells, with milder winters reducing fatalities from extreme cold, even if individual cold extreme weather may sometimes be caused by changes due to climate change and possibly even become more frequent in some regions.

Tropical cyclones

Tropical cyclones and climate change

In 2020, the National Oceanic and Atmospheric Administration (NOAA) of the U.S. government predicted that, over the 21st Century, the frequency of tropical storms and Atlantic hurricanes would decline by 25 percent while their maximum intensity would rise 5 percent. Prior to the new study there was a decade-long debate about a possible increase of tropical cyclones as an effect of climate change. However, the 2012 IPCC special report on extreme events SREX states that "there is low confidence in any observed long-term (i.e., 40 years or more) increases in tropical cyclone activity (i.e., intensity, frequency, duration), after accounting for past changes in observing capabilities." Increases in population densities increase the number of people affected and damage caused by an event of given severity. The World Meteorological Organization and the U.S. Environmental Protection Agency have in the past linked increasing extreme weather events to climate change, as have Hoyos et al. (2006), writing that the increasing number of category 4 and 5 hurricanes is directly linked to increasing temperatures.  Similarly, Kerry Emanuel in Nature writes that hurricane power dissipation is highly correlated with temperature, reflecting climate change. 'Cyclones are an example of extreme weather events. 

.

Hurricane modeling has produced similar results, finding that hurricanes, simulated under warmer, high CO2 conditions, are more intense than under present-day conditions. Thomas Knutson and Robert E. Tuleya of the NOAA stated in 2004 that warming-induced by greenhouse gas may lead to the increasing occurrence of highly destructive category-5 storms. Vecchi and Soden find that wind shear, the increase of which acts to inhibit tropical cyclones, also changes in model-projections of climate change. There are projected increases of wind shear in the tropical Atlantic and East Pacific associated with the deceleration of the Walker circulation, as well as decreases of wind shear in the western and central Pacific. The study does not make claims about the net effect on Atlantic and East Pacific hurricanes of the warming and moistening atmospheres, and the model-projected increases in Atlantic wind shear.

 Effects 
The effects of extreme weather includes, but not limited to:
 Too much rain (heavy downpours), causing floods and landslides
 Too much heat and no rain (heatwave) causing droughts and wildfires
 Strong winds, such as hurricanes and tornadoes, causing damage to man made structures and animal habitats
 Large snowfalls, causing avalanches and blizzards

 Economic cost 

According to IPCC (2011) estimates of annual losses have ranged since 1980 from a few billion to above US$200 billion (in 2010 dollars), with the highest value for 2005 (the year of Hurricane Katrina). The global weather-related disaster losses, such as loss of human lives, cultural heritage, and ecosystem services, are difficult to value and monetize, and thus they are poorly reflected in estimates of losses. Yet, recent abnormally intense storms, hurricanes, floods, heatwaves, droughts and associated large-scale wildfires have led to unprecedented negative ecological consequences for tropical forests and coral reefs around the world.

 Loss of human lives 
The death toll from natural disasters has declined over 90 percent since the 1920s, according to the International Disaster Database, even as the total human population on Earth quadrupled, and temperatures rose 1.3 °C. In the 1920s, 5.4 million people died from natural disasters while in the 2010s, just 400,000 did.

The most dramatic and rapid declines in deaths from extreme weather events have taken place in south Asia. Where a tropical cyclone in 1991 in Bangladesh killed 135,000 people, and a 1970 cyclone killed 300,000, the similarly-sized Cyclone Ampham, which struck India and Bangladesh in 2020, killed just 120 people in total.

In the United States, major hurricanes can produce flooding from storm surges and extreme rainfall and account for 75% of all fatalities.

On July 23, 2020, Munich Re announced that the 2,900 total global deaths from natural disasters for the first half of 2020 was a record-low, and “much lower than the average figures for both the last 30 years and the last 10 years.”

A 2021 study found that 9.4% of global deaths between 2000 and 2019 – ~5 million annually – can be attributed to extreme temperature with cold-related ones making up the larger share and decreasing and heat-related ones making up ~0.91 % and increasing.

 Droughts and floods

Climate change has led to an increase in the frequency and/or intensity of certain types of extreme weather. Storms such as hurricanes or tropical cyclones may experience greater rainfall, causing major flooding events or landslides by saturating soil. This is because warmer air is able to ‘hold’ more moisture due to the water molecules having increased kinetic energy, and precipitation occurs at a greater rate because more molecules have the critical speed needed to fall as rain drops. A shift in rainfall patterns can lead to greater amounts of precipitation in one area while another experiences much hotter, drier conditions, which can lead to drought. This is because an increase in temperatures also lead to an increase in evaporation at the surface of the earth, so more precipitation does not necessarily mean universally wetter conditions or a worldwide increase in drinking water.

 Changes in ecosystems 

Extreme weather negatively affects the ecosystems through various events resulting the serious impact on the landscape and people.

 Human activities that exacerbate the effects 
There are plenty of anthropogenic activities that can exacerbate the effects of extreme weather events. Urban planning often amplifies urban flooding impacts, especially in areas that are at increased risk of storms due to their location and climate variability. First, increasing the amount of impervious surfaces, such as sidewalks, roads, and roofs, means that less of the water from incoming storms is absorbed by the land. The destruction of wetlands, which act as a natural reservoir by absorbing water, can intensify the impact of floods and extreme precipitation. This can happen both inland and at the coast. However, wetland destruction along the coast can mean decreasing an area’s natural ‘cushion,’ thus allowing storm surges and flood waters to reach farther inland during hurricanes or cyclones. Building homes below sea level or along a floodplain puts residents at increased risk of destruction or injury in an extreme precipitation event.

More urban areas can also contribute to the rise of extreme or unusual weather events. Tall structures can alter the way that wind moves throughout an urban area, pushing warmer air upwards and inducing convection, creating thunderstorms. With these thunderstorms comes increased precipitation, which, because of the large amounts of impervious surfaces in cities, can have devastating impacts. Impervious surfaces also absorb energy from the sun and warm the atmosphere, causing drastic increases in temperatures in urban areas. This, along with pollution and heat released from cars and other anthropogenic sources, contributes to urban heat islands.

 Attribution 
Generally speaking, one event in extreme weather cannot be attributed to any one cause; however, certain system wide changes to global weather systems can lead to increased frequency or intensity of extreme weather events.

 Natural variability 
Aspects of our climate system have a certain level of natural variability, and extreme weather events can occur for several reasons beyond human impact, including changes in pressure or the movement of air. Areas along the coast or located in tropical regions are more likely to experience storms with heavy precipitation than temperate regions, although such events can occur. Not every unusual weather event can be blamed on climate change. The atmosphere is a complex and dynamic system, influenced by several factors such as the natural tilt and orbit of the Earth, the absorption or reflection of solar radiation, the movement of air masses, and the hydrologic cycle. Due to this, weather patterns can experience some variation, and so extreme weather can be attributed, at least in part, to the natural variability that exists on Earth. Climatic variations such as the El Niño-Southern Oscillation or the North Atlantic Oscillation impact weather patterns in specific regions of the world, influencing temperature and precipitation. The record-breaking extreme weather events that have been catalogued throughout the past two hundred years most likely arise when climate patterns like ENSO or NAO work “in the same direction as human‐induced warming."

 Climate change

Some studies assert a connection between rapidly warming arctic temperatures and thus a vanishing cryosphere to extreme weather in mid-latitudes. In a study published in Nature in 2019, scientists used several simulations to determine that the melting of ice sheets in Greenland and Antarctica could affect overall sea level and sea temperature. Other models have shown that modern temperature rise and the subsequent addition of meltwater to the ocean could lead to a disruption of the thermohaline circulation, which is responsible for the movement of seawater and distribution of heat around the globe. A collapse of this circulation in the northern hemisphere could lead to an increase in extreme temperatures in Europe, as well as more frequent storms by throwing off natural climate variability and conditions. Thus, as increasing temperatures cause glaciers to melt, mid-latitudes could experience shifts in weather patterns or temperatures.

The increasing probability of record week-long heat extremes occurrence depends on warming rate, rather than global warming level.

There were around 6,681 climate-related events reported during 2000-2019, compared to 3,656 climate-related events reported during 1980–1999. In this report, a ‘climate-related event’ refers to floods, storms, droughts, landslides, extreme temperatures (like heat waves or freezes), and wildfires; it excludes geophysical events such as volcanic eruptions, earthquakes, or mass movements. While there is evidence that a changing global climate, such as an increase in temperature, has impacted the frequency of extreme weather events, the most significant effects are likely to arise in the future. This is where climate models are useful, for they can provide simulations on how the atmosphere may behave over time and what steps need to be taken in the present day to mitigate any negative changes.

Some researchers attribute increases in extreme weather occurrences to more reliable reporting systems. A difference in what qualifies as ‘extreme weather’ in varying climate systems could also be argued. Over or under reporting of casualties or losses can lead to inaccuracy in the impact of extreme weather.  However, the UN reports show that, although some countries have experienced greater effects, there have been increases in extreme weather events on all continents. Current evidence and climate models show that an increasing global temperature will intensify extreme weather events around the globe, thereby amplifying human loss, damages and economic costs, and ecosystem destruction.

 Attribution research 
Early research in extreme weather focused on statements about predicting certain events. Contemporary research focuses more on attribution of causes to trends in events. In particular the field is focusing on climate change alongside other causal factors for these events.

A 2016 report from the National Academies of Sciences, Engineering, and Medicine, recommended investing in improved shared practices across the field working on attribution research, improving the connection between research outcomes and weather forecasting.

As more research is done in this area, scientists have begun to investigate the connection between climate change and extreme weather events and what future impacts may arise. Much of this work is done through climate modeling. Climate models provide important predictions about the future characteristics of the atmosphere, oceans, and Earth using data collected in the modern day. However, while climate models are vital for studying more complex processes such as climate change or ocean acidification, they are still only approximations. Moreover, weather events are complex and cannot be tied to a singular cause—there are often many atmospheric variables such as temperature, pressure, or moisture to note on top of any influences from climate change or natural variability.

An important record of extreme weather events is gathered statistics from around the world, which can help scientists and policymakers to have a better punderstanding of any changes in weather and climate conditions. These statistics can influence climate modeling as well. Statistics have shown an increase in extreme weather events throughout the 1900s and into the 2000s.

See also

Heat burst
List of tropical cyclones
Lists of tornadoes and tornado outbreaks
List of weather records
Downburst
Rogue wave
Severe weather
 List of severe weather phenomena
Storm
U.S. state and territory temperature extremes
Weather-related fatalities in the United States
Extreme weather events of 535–536
Year Without a Summer

References

External links
 NOAA/NCDC Billion-Dollar Weather and Climate Disasters
Statistics of Weather and Climate Extremes  The University Corporation for Atmospheric Research (UCAR)
Research forecasts increased chances for stormy weather , Purdue University study
Extreme weather articles at Think Progress''
European severe weather database
National severe weather database browser
Severe world weather overview

Weather hazards
Severe weather and convection
Effects of climate change
Articles containing video clips